Ruth Anker Høyer (born 19 January 1945) is a Danish-born Norwegian judge and women's rights leader. She is a former president of the Norwegian Association of Female Lawyers and has also been President of the Oslo Bar Association and a member of the presidium of the Norwegian Bar Association.

Career

She studied law at the University of Copenhagen and graduated in 1970. She moved to Norway following her marriage to the Norwegian judge Jon Bonnevie Høyer, a grandson of the women's rights leader Margarete Bonnevie.

She worked in the National Insurance Administration, the Council for Gender Equality and the Consumer Council, and later practised as a lawyer in Oslo, from 1985 with her own law firm and specializing in family law. In 1994 she was appointed by the King-in-Council as a judge on the Oslo District Court, Norway's largest court, where she became head of one of the departments. She has been one of the most high-profile female judges in Norway since the 1990s. After her retirement, she worked as an extraordinary judge on the Borgarting Court of Appeal.

She has been President of the Norwegian Association of Female Lawyers, President of the Oslo Bar Association, a member of the presidium of the Norwegian Bar Association and a member of the national board of the Norwegian Association for Women's Rights. She has also served as a member of several government-appointed committees, including the Royal Commission on Competition in the Legal Profession (2001–2002), appointed by the first Stoltenberg government.

Bibliography
Ruth Høyer (1976): Ekteskap og forsørgelse. Likestillingsrådet.

References

1945 births
Living people
20th-century Danish lawyers
University of Copenhagen alumni
Danish emigrants to Norway
20th-century Norwegian judges
Norwegian women judges
Norwegian feminists
Norwegian Association for Women's Rights people
21st-century Norwegian lawyers
20th-century women judges